Mohammed Al-Bakri is a Qatari footballer who plays as a goalkeeper for Al-Duhail, and the Qatar national team.

Career
Al Bakri was included in Qatar's squad for the 2019 AFC Asian Cup in the United Arab Emirates.

Career statistics

International

References

External links
 
 
 
 
 Mohammed Al Bakri at WorldFootball.com

1997 births
Living people
People from Doha
Qatari footballers
Qatar international footballers
Qatar youth international footballers
Qatari expatriate footballers
Expatriate footballers in Austria
Expatriate footballers in Belgium
Qatari expatriate sportspeople in Austria
Qatari expatriate sportspeople in Belgium
Association football goalkeepers
Al-Wakrah SC players
Al-Duhail SC players
FC Juniors OÖ players
K.A.S. Eupen players
Al-Markhiya SC players
Al-Khor SC players
Al-Shahania SC players
Qatar Stars League players
2019 AFC Asian Cup players
AFC Asian Cup-winning players